G.J. College, Bihta, also known as Sri Gadadharachaya Janta College, established in 1958, is a general degree college in Ramgarh, Bihta, Bihar. It is a constituent unit of Patliputra University. College offers undergraduate courses in science, commerce, and arts.

Departments

Science

Chemistry
Physics
Mathematics
Zoology
Botany
Computer Science

Arts 

English
Hindi
Economics
Political Science
Philosophy
Psychology

References

External links
Official website of college

Constituent colleges of Patliputra University
Universities and colleges in Bihar
Educational institutions established in 1958
1958 establishments in Bihar